Thakali may refer to:

 Thakali people
 Thakali language

Language and nationality disambiguation pages